Enco Malindi (born 15 January 1987) is an Albanian professional footballer who plays as a forward.

Early life
Malindi is not common surname among Albanian people, though it's more common surname among black Africans. Enco Malindi was being born to a foreign mother (presumably Italian or Bulgarian) and Albanian father.

Club career

Early career
Malindi started his career in his home town of Tirana with local team Partizani Tirana. After playing well in Albania he was spotted by the Bulgarian club Slavia Sofia. Malindi completed his dream move to Slavia Sofia in early 2008 for a total fee of €80,000.

Slavia Sofia
He joined Slavia Sofia in March 2008 and made his official debut for the club in a match against Chernomorets Burgas on 30 March 2008, playing 60 minutes, with the match finishing 1–1. During his spell at the club, Malindi wore the number 99 shirt.

Spartak Varna
On 29 July 2008 Malindi signed with PFC Spartak Varna for a fee €50,000. He made his unofficial debut for the falcons one day later in a match against Chernomorets Balchik by playing 45 minutes and scoring one goal. The result of the match was 2–0. During the 2008–09 season, he appeared in 20 matches.

Kukësi
On 6 July 2012, Malindi joined Kukësi on a free transfer for the upcoming 2012–13 season, the club's first ever Albanian Superliga season, signing a one-year contract.

Kastrioti Krujë
On 2 September 2013, Malindi signed a one-year contract with Kastrioti Krujë, his sixth Albanian club. The team struggled for results and was relegated back to Albanian First Division at the end of the season, which led Malindi to terminate his contract by mutual consensus.

Elbasani
At the end of the season, Elbasani was relegated back to Albanian First Division which led Malindi to terminate his cooperating with the club on 29 May 2015.

Tërbuni Pukë
On 22 July 2015, Malindi signed a contract with the newly promoted side Tërbuni Pukë in its first ever Albanian Superliga season. He made his debut on 23 August in team's opening league match of the season against Tirana, scoring the club's first ever Albanian Superliga goal in an eventual 2–1 home defeat.

Laçi
On 4 January 2016, Malindi agreed personal terms and signed a contract until the end of 2015–16 season with Laçi, taking the squad number 17. He was called up to the team for the first time on 23 January for the first leg of quarter-final of 2015–16 Albanian Cup against Partizani Tirana, where he was an unused substitute in a 2–0 home win. Malindi made his competitive debut seven days later versus the same opponent at Qemal Stafa Stadium, playing 85 minutes before was sent-off. He left the club in December 2016 after terminating the contract by mutual consent.

Return to Kamza
On 7 January 2017, Malidi agreed personal terms and returned to Kamza, this time in Albanian First Division.

Return to Kastrioti Krujë
On 26 July 2017, Kastrioti announced that they have acquired the services of 6 players, including Malindi, for the 2017–18 season.

International career
Malindi represented Albania at youth levels, playing for the under-17, -19 and -21.

Career statistics

References

External links

FSHF

1986 births
Living people
Footballers from Tirana
Albanian footballers
Association football forwards
Albania youth international footballers
Albania under-21 international footballers
FK Partizani Tirana players
PFC Slavia Sofia players
PFC Spartak Varna players
KF Tirana players
KF Skënderbeu Korçë players
Akademik Sofia players
FC Locarno players
FC Kamza players
FK Kukësi players
KS Kastrioti players
KF Elbasani players
KF Tërbuni Pukë players
KF Laçi players
Kategoria Superiore players
First Professional Football League (Bulgaria) players
Albanian expatriate footballers
Expatriate footballers in Bulgaria
Albanian expatriate sportspeople in Bulgaria
Expatriate footballers in Switzerland
Albanian expatriate sportspeople in Switzerland